The 1942 Ball State Cardinals football team was an American football team that represented Ball State Teachers College (later renamed Ball State University) as a member of the Indiana Intercollegiate Conference (IIC) during the 1942 college football season. In their eighth season under head coach John Magnabosco, the Cardinals compiled a 6–2 record (5–0 against IIC opponents), won the IIC championship, and outscored opponents by a total of 178 to 58.

Schedule

References

Ball State
Ball State Cardinals football seasons
Ball State Cardinals football